Rodolfo Salinas Ortiz (born 29 August 1987) is a Mexican professional footballer who plays as a midfielder.

Club career
He made his debut on January 21, 2007, against Club América in which San Luis lost 4–1. His number at the time was #98. He played 7 league games in the entire Clausura season. In the apertura season of 2007 he played 5 games and scored no goals. He scored his first goal against CF Monterrey on March 15, 2008, in which San Luis won 3–1. For the 2008–2009 season he has a starting position. He scored his second goal against Puebla in which the game ended 1-1.

He played with Los Cabos of the Liga de Balompié Mexicano during the league's inaugural season in 2020–21.

Honours
Santos Laguna
Liga MX: Clausura 2012, Clausura 2015
Copa MX: Apertura 2014

References

External links
 
 

1987 births
Living people
Mexican footballers
Association football midfielders
San Luis F.C. players
Santos Laguna footballers
Atlas F.C. footballers
Club Atlético Zacatepec players
Liga MX players
Liga de Balompié Mexicano players
Footballers from Durango
People from Gómez Palacio, Durango
Pan American Games bronze medalists for Mexico
Medalists at the 2007 Pan American Games
Footballers at the 2007 Pan American Games
Pan American Games medalists in football